The final of the women's 4 × 100 metre medley relay event at the 1984 Summer Olympics was held in Los Angeles, California, on August 3, 1984.

Records
Prior to this competition, the existing world and Olympic records were as follows.

Results

Heats
Rule: The eight fastest teams advance to the final (Q).

Final

References

External links
 Official Report
 USA Swimming

R
4 × 100 metre medley relay
1984 in women's swimming
Women's events at the 1984 Summer Olympics